Girllove may refer to:
 Pedophilia, sexual attraction to children
 Girls' love, Japanese lesbian fiction
 GirlLove (charity), an anti-bullying campaign led by Lilly Singh

See also
 Boylove (disambiguation)